Ribadumia is a municipality in Galicia, Spain in the province of Pontevedra.

In 1151, in the parroquia of Barrantes now in Ribadumia, a group tried to found a monastery with the help of the local magnate Gómez Núñez, but their efforts came to nothing.

Notes

Municipalities in the Province of Pontevedra